Prithibi Majhi is an Indian politician. He was a Member of Parliament, representing Assam in the Rajya Sabha the upper house of India's Parliament representing the Indian National Congress. He was a Deputy Speaker and Speaker of the Assam Legislative Assembly and a minister in the Tarun Gogoi cabinet.

Early life and education 
Prithibi Majhi was born on 24 January 1951 to the Late Birsingh Majhi and Sita Majhi. Majhi received his B.A. from DHSK college in Dibrugarh and L.L.B. from Dispur Law College at Gauhati University.

Political career 
Majhi was first elected to the Assembly in 1991 for Tingkhong. He was then elected in 1996 but for Lahowal. He was then a Member of the Rajya Sabha. In 1993 he was made Deputy Speaker and in 2001 he was made Speaker.

Personal life 
He first married the late Anita Majhi. After her death, he later married Dr. Tarulata Kakoti Majhi on 10 December 1997. He and his second wife had 2 daughters and 2 sons. His wife is the vice Principal of Dibrugarh Nursing College. Majhi gave his wife the 1st Birsingh Majhi Award in memory of his father in 2012.

Positions 

 Secretary, Assam Tea Garden Tribes Students Association, (1968 to 1978)
 General Secretary, All Assam Santal Committee
 Deputy Chief Executive Councillor, Dibrugarh Mahkuma Parishad, Dibrugarh (1979–83)
 Chief Administrator, Dibrugarh Mahkuma Parishad (1983–84)
 Member of Working Committee, INTUC (Assam Branch).
 Vice President, Assam Chah Mazdoor Sangha (Affiliated to INTUC), (1993-1996)
 Member, Working Committee, Assam Chah Mazdoor Sangha
 Adviser, Adibasi Socio-Educational and Cultural Association, Assam
 Vice Chairman, Assam Tea Employees Welfare Board (1991-1993)
 General Secretary, Assam Tea Employees Industrial Co-operative Organisation Limited (ATEICOL) Employees Union(1978-1983).
 Member, Rajya Sabha, (1984-1990).
 Member of Legislative Assembly from 119-Tingkhong Constituency for 1991-1996 term.
 Chairman, Assam State Textile Corporation (1991-1993)
 Deputy Speaker, Assam Legislative Assembly (1993-1996)
 Member of Legislative Assembly from 117-Lahowal Constituency (1996-2001).
 General Secretary, Assam Pradesh Congress Committee(I) in 1997.
 Honorary Member, All India Santal Writers Association.
 Vice President, Assam Tea & Ex-Tea Tribes, Literature Art & Cultural Parishad under Srimanta Sankardev Kala Khetra, Guwahati.
 Member of Legislative Assembly from 117-Lahowal Constituency for 2001-2006 term
 Elected Speaker of Assam Legislative Assembly, 2001.
 Chairman, NERCPA, 2002
 Chairman , North East Regional Institute of Parliamentary Studies, Training and Research (2002-2006).
 Member of Legislative Assembly from 117-Lahowal Constituency for 2006-2011 term
 Minister, Planning and Development, Labour and Employment and Tea-Tribes Welfare, Government of Assam, from 2006 to 2008.
 Minister, Water Resources, Labour and Employment and Tea-Tribes Welfare, Government of Assam, from 2008 to 2011. 
 President, International Santhal Council from 2008.
 Permanent Invitee to Working Committee, INTUC (Assam Branch)
 Permanent Invitee to Working Committee, Assam Chah Mazdoor Sangha.
 Elected Member of Assam Legislative Assembly from 117-Lahowal Constituency on 2011.
 Elected Deputy Leader, Congress Legislative Party, Assam Legislative Assembly, in 2011.
 Minister, Revenue and Disaster Management, Labour and Employment and Tea-Tribes Welfare, Government of Assam, from 2011-2015.

References

Rajya Sabha members from Assam
1951 births
Living people